Northwest is one of the six multi-member constituencies of the Althing, the national legislature of Iceland. The constituency was established as Northwestern in 1959 following the nationwide extension of proportional representation for elections to the Althing.  It was renamed Northwest in 2003 when the Western and Westfjords constituencies were merged into the Northwestern constituency following the re-organisation of constituencies across Iceland. Northwest consists of the regions of Northwestern, Western and Westfjords. The constituency currently elects seven of the 63 members of the Althing using the open party-list proportional representation electoral system. At the 2021 parliamentary election it had 21,541 registered electors.

Electoral system
Northwest currently elects seven of the 63 members of the Althing using the open party-list proportional representation electoral system. Constituency seats are allocated using the D'Hondt method. Compensatory seats (equalisation seas) are calculated based on the national vote and are allocated using the D'Hondt method at the constituency level. Only parties that reach the 5% national threshold compete for compensatory seats.

Election results

Summary

(Excludes compensatory seats.)

Detailed

2020s

2021
Results of the 2021 parliamentary election held on 25 September 2021:

The following candidates were elected:
Bergþór Ólasonn (M), 1,249.67 votes; Bjarni Jónsson (V), 1,941.33 votes; Eyjólfur Ármanns­son (F), 1,507.67 votes; Halla Signý Kristjánsdóttir (B), 2,974.50 votes; Haraldur Benediktsson (D), 2,882.50 votes; Lilja Rannveig Sigurgeirsdóttir (B), 3,703.50 votes; Stefán Vagn Stefánsson (B), 4,393.00 votes; and Þórdís Kolbrún R. Gylfadóttir (D), 3,854.75 votes.

2010s

2017
Results of the 2017 parliamentary election held on 28 October 2017:

The following candidates were elected:
Ásmundur Einar Daðason (B), 3,078.75 votes; Bergþór Ólasonn (M), 2,442.00 votes; Guðjón Brjánsson (S), 1,637.00 votes; Halla Signý Kristjánsdóttir (B), 2,395.50 votes; Haraldur Benediktsson (D), 4,200.25 votes; Lilja Rafney Magnúsdóttir (V), 3,032.33 votes; Sigurður Páll Jónsson (M), 1,842.50 votes; and Þórdís Kolbrún R. Gylfadóttir (D), 3,174.00 votes.

2016
Results of the 2016 parliamentary election held on 29 October 2016:

The following candidates were elected:
Elsa Lára Arnardóttir (B), 2,691.75 votes; Eva Pandora Baldursdóttir (P), 1,814.00 votes; Gunnar Bragi Sveinsson (B), 3,118.50 votes; Guðjón Brjánsson (S), 1,042.00 votes; Haraldur Benediktsson (D), 4,919.00 votes; Lilja Rafney Magnúsdóttir (V), 2,987.33 votes; Teitur Björnsson (D), 3,298.17 votes; and Þórdís Kolbrún R. Gylfadóttir (D), 4,117.50 votes.

2013
Results of the 2013 parliamentary election held on 27 April 2013:

The following candidates were elected:
Ásmundur Einar Daðason (B), 5,314.6 votes; Einar Kristinn Guðfinnsson (D), 4,186.5 votes; Elsa Lára Arnardóttir (B), 4,581.0 votes; Gunnar Bragi Sveinsson (B), 6,078.0 votes; Guðbjartur Hannesson (S), 2,109.0 votes; Haraldur Benediktsson (D), 3,203.3 votes; Jóhanna María Sigmundsdóttir (B), 3,821.4 votes; and Lilja Rafney Magnúsdóttir (V), 1,460.0 votes.

2000s

2009
Results of the 2009 parliamentary election held on 25 April 2009:

The following candidates were elected:
Ásbjörn Óttarsson (D), 3,950.0 votes; Ásmundur Einar Daðason (V), 2,703.5 votes; Einar Kristinn Guðfinnsson (D), 2,908.0 votes; Gunnar Bragi Sveinsson (B), 3,942.2 votes; Guðbjartur Hannesson (S), 3,959.2 votes; Guðmundur Steingrímsson (B), 2,929.5 votes; Jón Bjarnason (V), 3,871.0 votes; Lilja Rafney Magnúsdóttir (V), 3,344.8 votes; and Ólína Þorvarðardóttir (S), 2,900.0 votes.

2007
Results of the 2007 parliamentary election held on 12 May 2007:

The following candidates were elected:
Einar Kristinn Guðfinnsson (D), 4,348.7 votes; Einar Oddur Kristjánsson (D), 3,379.8 votes; Guðbjartur Hannesson (S), 3,772.0 votes; Guðjón Arnar Kristjánsson (F), 2,426.0 votes; Jón Bjarnason (V), 2,807.7 votes; Karl V. Matthíasson (S), 2,776.7 votes; Kristinn H. Gunnarsson (F), 1,812.7 votes; Magnús Stefánsson (B), 3,347.3 votes; and Sturla Böðvarsson (D), 4,903.7 votes.

2003
Results of the 2003 parliamentary election held on 10 May 2003:

The following candidates were elected:
Anna Kristín Gunnarsdóttir (S), 3,223.7 votes; Einar Oddur Kristjánsson (D), 3,664.3 votes; Einar Kristinn Guðfinnsson (D), 4,646.2 votes; Guðjón Arnar Kristjánsson (F), 2,666.0 votes; Jóhann Ársælsson (S), 4,285.0 votes; Jón Bjarnason (U), 1,970.7 votes; Kristinn H. Gunnarsson (B), 2,928.0 votes; Magnús Stefánsson (B), 4,017.5 votes; Sigurjón Þórðarson (F), 1,993.2 votes; and Sturla Böðvarsson (D), 5,078.7 votes.

1990s

1999
Results of the 1999 parliamentary election held on 8 May 1999:

The following candidates were elected:
Hjálmar Jónsson (D), 1,875 votes; Jón Bjarnason (U), 560 votes; Kristján L. Möller (S), 1,452 votes; Páll Bragi Pétursson (B), 1,802 votes; and Vilhjálmur Egilsson (D), 1,893 votes.

1995
Results of the 1995 parliamentary election held on 8 April 1995:

The following candidates were elected:
Hjálmar Jónsson (D), 1,892 votes; Páll Bragi Pétursson (B), 2,427 votes; Ragnar Arnalds (G), 984 votes; Stefán Sigurður Guðmundsson (B), 2,438 votes; and Vilhjálmur Egilsson (D), 1,913 votes.

1991
Results of the 1991 parliamentary election held on 20 April 1991:

The following candidates were elected:
Páll Bragi Pétursson (B), 2,019 votes; Pálmi Jónsson (D), 1,756 votes; Ragnar Arnalds (G), 1,218 votes; Stefán Sigurður Guðmundsson (B), 2,034 votes; and Vilhjálmur Egilsson (D), 1,714 votes.

1980s

1987
Results of the 1987 parliamentary election held on 25 April 1987:

The following candidates were elected:
Jón Sæmundur Sigurjónsson (A), 656 votes; Páll Bragi Pétursson (B), 2,246 votes; Pálmi Jónsson (D), 1,363 votes; Ragnar Arnalds (G), 1,014 votes; and Stefán Sigurður Guðmundsson (B), 2,250 votes.

1983
Results of the 1983 parliamentary election held on 23 April 1983:

The following candidates were elected:
Eyjólfur Konráð Jónsson (D), 1,602 votes; Páll Bragi Pétursson (B), 1,622 votes; Pálmi Jónsson (D), 1,773 votes; Ragnar Arnalds (G), 1,028 votes; and Stefán Sigurður Guðmundsson (B), 1,478 votes.

1970s

1979
Results of the 1979 parliamentary election held on 2 and 3 December 1979:

The following candidates were elected:
Eyjólfur Konráð Jónsson (D), 803 votes; Ingólfur Guðnasson (B), 2,007 votes; Páll Bragi Pétursson (B), 2,492 votes; Pálmi Jónsson (D), 1,605 votes; Ragnar Arnalds (G), 984 votes; and Stefán Sigurður Guðmundsson (B), 2,255 votes.

1978
Results of the 1978 parliamentary election held on 25 June 1978:

The following candidates were elected:
Eyjólfur Konráð Jónsson (D), 1,359 votes; Finnur Torfi Stefánsson (A), 752 votes; Ólafur Jóhannesson (B), 1,783 votes; Páll Bragi Pétursson (B), 1,602 votes; Pálmi Jónsson (D), 1,518 votes; and Ragnar Arnalds (G), 1,189 votes.

1974
Results of the 1974 parliamentary election held on 30 June 1974:

The following candidates were elected:
Eyjólfur Konráð Jónsson (D), 1,549 votes; Ólafur Jóhannesson (B), 2,027 votes; Páll Bragi Pétursson (B), 1,812 votes; Pálmi Jónsson (D), 1,753 votes; and Ragnar Arnalds (G), 851 votes.

1971
Results of the 1971 parliamentary election held on 13 June 1971:

The following candidates were elected:
Björn Pálsson (B), 1,795 votes; Gunnar Gíslason (D), 1,673 votes; Ólafur Jóhannesson (B), 2,005 votes; Pálmi Jónsson (D), 1,509 votes; Pétur Pétursson (A), 566 votes; and Ragnar Arnalds (G), 895 votes.

1960s

1967
Results of the 1967 parliamentary election held on 11 June 1967:

The following candidates were elected:
Björn Pálsson (B), 1,601 votes; Gunnar Gíslason (D), 1,703 votes; Jón Þorsteinsson (A), 652 votes; Ólafur Jóhannesson (B), 1,806 votes; Pálmi Jónsson (D), 1,531 votes; and Skúli Guðmundsson (B), 2,007 votes.

1963
Results of the 1963 parliamentary election held on 9 June 1963:

The following candidates were elected:
Björn Pálsson (B), 1,668 votes; Einar Ingimundarson (D), 1,589 votes; Gunnar Gíslason (D), 1,765 votes; Jón Þorsteinsson (A), 537 votes; Ólafur Jóhannesson (B), 1,921 votes; Ragnar Arnalds (G), 663 votes; and Skúli Guðmundsson (B), 2,133 votes.

1950s

October 1959
Results of the October 1959 parliamentary election held on 25 and 26 October 1959:

The following candidates were elected:
Björn Pálsson (B), 1,716 votes; Einar Ingimundarson (D), 1,707 votes; Gunnar Gíslason (D), 1,897 votes; Gunnar jóhannsson (G), 616 votes; Jón Þorsteinsson (A), 495 votes; Ólafur Jóhannesson (B), 1,931 votes; and Skúli Guðmundsson (B), 2,145 votes.

References

1959 establishments in Iceland
Althing constituencies
Constituencies established in 1959
Althing constituency
Althing constituency
Althing constituency